One Fall is a 2011 American fantasy drama film directed by Marcus Dean Fuller, and produced by Dean Silvers and Marlen Hecht. Filming took place in New York.

Plot
Set in the rustic Midwestern U.S. town of One Fall, the film tells the story of a man, James (Marcus Dean Fuller), who miraculously survived a horrific fall from a spectacular 200-foot-high cliff and was never heard from again. However, three years after vanishing James chooses to return to his hometown of One Fall—but he returns a changed man. For an incomprehensible reason, James has developed supernatural healing abilities. He must decide whether to use his abilities to help the ones he once turned his back on or to continue running from his mysterious past.

Cast
 Marcus Dean Fuller as James Bond/The Janitor 
 Zoe McLellan as Julie Gardner
 Seamus Mulcahy as Tab Barrows/Repeller Boy
 James McCaffrey as Werber Bond
 Mark La Mura as Cliff Bond
 Dominic Fumusa as Tom Schmidt
 Mark Margolis as Walter Grigg Sr.
 Phyllis Somerville as Mrs. Barrows
 Tyler Silvers as Kyle

References

http://www.filmcritic.com/reviews/2011/one-fall/

http://www.slantmagazine.com/film/review/one-fall/5755

External links
 
 

2011 films
American fantasy drama films
2010s fantasy drama films
2011 drama films
2010s English-language films
2010s American films